TCL Technology (originally an abbreviation for Telephone Communication Limited) is a Chinese electronics company headquartered in Huizhou, Guangdong Province. It designs, develops, manufactures, and sells consumer products including television sets, mobile phones, air conditioners, washing machines, refrigerators, and small electrical appliances. In 2010, it was the world's 25th-largest consumer electronics producer. It became the second-largest television manufacturer by market share by 2019.

On 7 February 2020, TCL Corporation changed its name to TCL Technology.

TCL comprises five listed companies: TCL Technology, listed on the Shenzhen Stock Exchange, TCL Electronics Holdings, Ltd., TCL Communication Technology Holdings, Ltd. (former code ; delisted in 2016), China Display Optoelectronics Technology Holdings Ltd., and Tonly Electronics Holdings Ltd., listed on the Hong Kong Stock Exchange.

TCL Technology's business structure is focused on three major sectors: semiconductor display, semiconductor and semiconductor photovoltaic, industrial finance and capital.

History 

The company was founded in 1981 under the brand name TTK as an audio cassette manufacturer. It was founded as a state-owned enterprise.

In 1985, after being sued by TDK for intellectual property violation, the company changed its brand name to TCL by taking the initials from Telephone Communication Limited.

In 1999, TCL entered the Vietnamese market.

On 19 September 2002, TCL announced the acquisition of all consumer electronics related assets of the former German company Schneider Rundfunkwerke AG, including the right to use its trademarks as Schneider, Dual, Albona, Joyce and Logix.

In July 2003, TCL chairman Li Dongsheng formally announced a "Dragon and Tiger Plan" to establish two competitive TCL businesses in global markets ("Dragons") and three leading businesses inside China ("Tigers").

In November 2003, TCL and Thomson SA of France announced the creation of a joint venture to produce televisions and DVD players worldwide. TCL took a 67 percent stake in the joint venture, with Thomson SA holding the rest of the shares, and it was agreed that televisions made by TCL-Thomson would be marketed under the TCL brand in Asia and the Thomson and RCA brands in Europe and North America.

In April 2004, TCL and Alcatel announced the creation of a mobile phone manufacturing joint venture: Alcatel Mobile Phones. TCL injected 55 million euros in the venture in return for a 55 per cent shareholding.

In April 2005, TCL closed its manufacturing plant in Türkheim, Bavaria, laying off 120 former Schneider employees.

In May 2005, TCL announced that its Hong Kong-listed unit would acquire Alcatel's 45 per cent stake in their mobile-phone joint venture for consideration of HK$63.34 million ($8.1 million) worth of TCL Communication shares.

In June 2007, TCL announced that its mobile phone division planned to cease using the Alcatel brand and switch entirely to the TCL brand within five years.

In April 2008, Samsung Electronics announced that it would be outsourcing the production of some LCD TV modules to TCL.

In July 2008, TCL announced that it planned to raise 1.7 billion yuan ($249 million) via a share placement on the Shenzhen Stock Exchange to fund the construction of two production lines for LCD televisions; one for screens of up to 42 inches, and the other for screens of up to 56 inches. TCL sold a total of 4.18 million LCD TV sets in 2008, more than triple the number during 2007.

In January 2009, TCL announced plans to double its LCD TV production capacity to 10 million units by the end of 2009.

In November 2009, TCL announced that it had formed a joint-venture with the Shenzhen government to construct an 8.5-generation thin film transistor-liquid crystal display production facility in the city at a cost of $3.9 billion.

In March 2010, TCL Multimedia raised HK$525 million through the sale of shares on the Hong Kong Stock Exchange, in order to fund the development of its LCD and LED businesses and to generate working capital.

In May 2011, TCL launched the China Smart Multimedia Terminal Technology Association in partnership with Hisense Electric Co. and Sichuan Changhong Electric Co., with the aim of helping to establish industry standards for smart televisions.

In January 2013, TCL bought the naming rights for Grauman's Chinese Theatre for $5 million.

In 2014, TCL changed the meaning of its identifying initials from "Telephone Communication Limited" to a branding slogan, "The Creative Life", for commercial purposes.

In February 2014, TCL spent 280 million RMB to purchase 11 percent shareholdings of Tianjin 712 Communication & Broadcasting Co., Ltd, a Chinese military-owned company which produces communication devices and navigation systems for the Chinese army.

In August 2014, TCL partnered with Roku for use as TCL's primary Smart TV platform. TCL Corporation and Tonly Electronics was implicated in bribing a government official in Guangdong province in exchange for government subsidies.

In October 2014, TCL acquired the Palm brand from HP for use on smartphones.

In 2016, TCL reached an agreement with BlackBerry Limited to produce smartphones under the BlackBerry brand, under BlackBerry Mobile. This deal ceased on 31 August 2020.

In 2019, due to restructuring, TCL completed the handover of major assets and was split into TCL Technology Group Corporation (TCL Technology) and TCL Industrial Holdings (TCL Industrials).

In 2020, TCL Technology acquired Samsung Display's assets in Suzhou, China, including a Gen 8.5 fab and a co-located LCD module plant.

Operations 

TCL is organized into five business divisions:

 Multimedia: TV sets
 Communications: cell phones and MIFI devices
 Home Appliances: AC units and laundry machines
 Home Electronics / Consumer Electronics: ODM products, like DVD, etc.
 Semiconductor Display and Materials: including China Star Optoelectronics Technology (CSOT), Guangdong Juhua Printing Display Technology Co., Ltd. and Guangzhou ChinaRay Optoelectronic Materials Co.,Ltd.

In addition, it has four affiliated business areas covering real estate and investment, logistics services, online education services, and finance.

In 2021, TCL has 28 research and development (R&D) organizations, 10 joint laboratories, and 22 manufacturing bases. TCL Corporation also has its own research facility called TCL Corporate Research, which is located in Shenzhen, with the objective to research cutting-edge technology innovations for other subsidiaries.

Products 

TCL's primary products are TVs, DVD players, air conditioners, mobile phones, home appliances, electric lighting, and digital media.

It primarily sells its products under the following brand names:
 TCL (in Africa, Asia, Australasia, Europe, North America, South America, and Russia (TV, air conditioners);
 Alcatel and Thomson mobile phones (global)
 BlackBerry (smartphones) global
 RCA branded electrical products in the United States.
 some Roku TV models in United States
The company, as of April 2012, is in venture with Swedish furniture giant IKEA to provide the consumer electronics behind the Uppleva integrated HDTV and entertainment system product.

Smartphones

In 2016, it contract manufactured the DTEK50 and DTEK60, for BlackBerry Limited, under their flagship BlackBerry brand. In December 2016, it became a licensee of the BlackBerry brand, to manufacture, distribute, and design devices for the global market. As of 2017, it distributes BlackBerry devices under the name of BlackBerry Mobile.

TCL is also the owner of the Palm brand. The company launched the Palm "ultra-mobile companion" smartphone in 2018.

In late 2019, TCL released their first own-branded Android phone, called the TCL Plex.

TCL announced the 10 series for 2020, consisting of the TCL 10 SE, TCL 10L, TCL 10 Pro, TCL 10 Plus and TCL 10 5G.

TCL Channel 

Since 2015, TCL offers its own video streaming service: GoLive TV or simply GoLive. It was later renamed TCL Channel in 2021.

References

External links 
 
 Official website TCL (USA)
 TCL (International)

Chinese brands
Chinese companies established in 1981
Companies based in Huizhou
2004 initial public offerings
Companies listed on the Shenzhen Stock Exchange
Computer hardware companies
Consumer electronics brands
Display technology companies
Electronics companies established in 1981
Electronics companies of China
Home appliance manufacturers of China
Mobile phone manufacturers
Multinational companies headquartered in China
Netbook manufacturers
Video equipment manufacturers
Mobile phone companies of China